Makana is a mountain on the island of Kauaʻi.

Makana may also refer to:

 Makana (musician), an American slack-key guitar player and singer
 Makana (prophet) (died 1819), a Xhosa warrior and prophet
 Makana F.A., a sporting body formed by political prisoners on Robben Island, South Africa
 Makana Local Municipality, a local authority in the Eastern Cape province of South Africa